Anna Phillips may refer to:

 Anna Phillips (Seventh-day Adventist) (1865–1926), prophetess
 Anna J. Phillips, American zoologist and curator
 Anna Lise Phillips, Australian actress
 Anna Maria Crouch (1763–1805), née Phillips, English singer and stage actress

See also
Anne Phillips (disambiguation), multiple people